Sportpark am Hallo is a facility consisting of an indoor sporting arena and an outdoor stadium located in Essen, Germany.  The capacity of the arena is 2,500 people, while the stadium can accommodate 3,800 spectators.  It is home to the Assindia Cardinals (American Football), ETB Essen (basketball) and TUSEM Essen (handball).

Handball venues in Germany
Indoor arenas in Germany
Essen
Sports venues in North Rhine-Westphalia
American football venues in Germany
Basketball venues in Germany